Garbiñe is a Spanish Basque female given name.
Garbiñe Abasolo (1964-) first Miss Spain from the Basque region, crowned in 1983
Garbiñe Muguruza (1993-), Spanish-Venezuelan tennis player

References

Spanish feminine given names